Park Seo-joon (born Park Yong-kyu; December 16, 1988) is a South Korean actor. He is best known for his starring roles in the television series Kill Me, Heal Me (2015), She Was Pretty (2015), Hwarang: The Poet Warrior Youth (2016–2017), Fight for My Way (2017), What's Wrong with Secretary Kim (2018), and Itaewon Class (2020). He has also appeared in films such as The Chronicles of Evil (2015), Midnight Runners (2017), and The Divine Fury (2019).

Early life
Park Seo-joon (born Park Yong-kyu) (Korean: 박용규) was born on December 16, 1988, in Seoul, South Korea. He began his mandatory military service in 2008, when he was 20 years old, and was discharged in 2010.

Career

2011-2015: Beginnings and breakthrough

Park made his entertainment debut in 2011 by appearing in the music video of Bang Yong-guk's single "I Remember." He played supporting roles in television dramas Dream High 2 (2012), Pots of Gold (2013), and One Warm Word (2013), and had his first leading role in A Witch's Love (2014). From October 2013 to April 2015, he hosted Music Bank.

His breakout roles came in 2015 with the dramas Kill Me, Heal Me and She Was Pretty, both of which he starred alongside Hwang Jung-eum. The same year, Park featured in thriller film The Chronicles of Evil.

2016-present: Mainstream popularity
In 2016, Park starred in youth historical drama Hwarang: The Poet Warrior Youth alongside Go Ara and Park Hyung-sik, playing a young man of low birth, who becomes a legendary Hwarang warrior in Silla dynasty.

Park found success in the 2017 KBS2 romance comedy drama, Fight for My Way where he played  Ko Dong-man – a former taekwondo player with a painful past, who struggles to find his success as a mixed martial arts fighter, alongside Kim Ji-won. The television series was a major hit in South Korea and topped ratings in its time slot.
The same year, he played his first big-screen leading role in the action-comedy Midnight Runners with Kang Ha-neul. Park won the Best New Actor award at major film award ceremonies such as the Grand Bell Awards and Korean Association of Film Critics Awards.

In 2018, Park starred in the romantic comedy drama What's Wrong with Secretary Kim, playing a narcissistic vice-chairman of a major corporation who falls in love with his secretary, played by Park Min-young. The series was a hit and Park received positive reviews from critics for his performance, being dubbed the "master of romantic comedy" by the Korean press.

In 2019, Park starred in the action horror film The Divine Fury in the role of a martial arts champion with divine powers. The same year Park served as the special juror for the Asiana International Short Film Festival. He also made a guest appearance in the Oscar-winning movie Parasite (2019).

In 2020, Park starred in JTBC drama Itaewon Class, based on the webtoon of the same name. He played an owner of a bar-restaurant who successfully expands it into a franchise. The drama was a success, and was praised for its interesting story development and colorful performances and Park was nominated for Best Actor - Television at 56th Baeksang Arts Awards

Upcoming roles
He is set to star in the sports film Dream as a soccer player turned coach named Yoon Hong-Dae, directed by Lee Byeong-heon, and disaster-thriller film Concrete Utopia directed by Um Tae-hwa. He will also appear in the MCU film The Marvels (2023) as Prince Yan.

Philanthropy 
On February 10, 2023, Park donated  to the Hope Bridge National Disaster Relief Association to help victims of the 2023 Turkey–Syria earthquake.

Filmography

Film

Television series

Web series

Web shows

Television shows

Hosting

Music video appearances

Discography

Awards and nominations

Listicles

References

External links

 
 
 

1988 births
Living people
South Korean male television actors
South Korean male film actors
Male actors from Seoul
21st-century South Korean male actors
Seoul Institute of the Arts alumni